Maccabeus is the sole genus of seticoronarian priapulid worms.

References

Priapulida
Ecdysozoa families